2-Methylsuccinic acid is an organic compound with the formula HO2CCH(CH3)CH2CO2H.  A white solid, it is the simplest chiral dicarboxylic acid.  It is a recurring component of urban aerosols.  Salts and esters of 2-methylsuccinic acid are called 2-methylsuccinates.

Preparation
It can be prepared by partial hydrogenation of itaconic acid over Raney nickel.  Alternatively, hydrocyanation of ethyl crotonate affords an intermediate, which converts to 2-methylsuccinic acid after hydrolysis of the ester and nitrile substituents.

References

Dicarboxylic acids